David "Dudi" Amsalem (born 11 August 1960), is an Israeli politician. He currently serves as a member of the Knesset for Likud. He previously held the posts of Minister of Communications, the Minister for Cyber and National Digital Matters and as the Government-Knesset Liaison.

Biography
David (Dudi) Amsalem was born and raised in Jerusalem.  His parents,  Avraham and Sultana Amsalem,  were immigrants from Morocco. Amsalem was educated at Yeshivat Or Etzion. During his IDF national service he was a tank commander in the Armored Corps. He later obtained a bachelor's degree in Economics and Business Administration from Bar-Ilan University.

A member of the Likud, he became chairman of the party's Jerusalem branch. He was placed 42nd on the joint Likud Beiteinu list for the 2013 Knesset elections, but with the alliance winning only 31 seats, he did not become a Knesset member. Prior to the 2015 Knesset elections he was placed 21st on the party's list, a slot reserved for a candidate from the Jerusalem area. He was elected to the Knesset as Likud won 30 seats. In December 2017 he was appointed whip of the governing coalition.

After being re-elected in the April 2019 elections, he was appointed as Minister of Communications on 1 July. He was re-elected in September 2019 and March 2020. In May 2020 he was appointed Minister for Cyber and National Digital Matters. Although he retained his seat in the 2021 elections, Likud went into opposition and he left the cabinet.

Amsalem has a long history of attacking non-Orthodox streams of Judaism. According to Yizhar Hess, executive director of the Conservative-Masorti movement in Israel, "There is no one in Likud who is more hostile to the non-Orthodox movements than Amsalem."

During a 2022 debate on legislation authorizing the hooking up of illegally built homes to the Israeli power grid, an issue that disproportionately impacts Israeli-Arab and Haredi citizens of Israel, Amsalem objected to Ra'am MK Walid Taha speaking Arabic during the legislative session, saying "look at what we’ve gotten to: Two Arabs speaking to each other... You will speak Hebrew here in the Israeli parliament."

After the Likud's victory in the elections to the 25th Knesset and the coalition negotiations to establish the 37th government of Israel, Amsalem demanded to serve as Minister of Justice or Speaker of the Knesset. Prime Minister Netanyahu refused to appoint him to one of these two positions, and offered him to be the Minister of Transportation. As a result, Amsalem refused to serve as a minister in the government, and announced that he would serve as a full member of the Knesset.

On February 12, 2023, the government decided on the addition of Amsalem to its ranks as an additional minister in the Ministry of Justice, the minister for regional cooperation and the liaison minister between the government and the Knesset.

Personal Life 
Amsalem is a widower with two daughters. His wife, Rosy Amsalem worked in the Jerusalem municipality until her death from lung cancer in 2009. He moved to Ma'ale Adumim following his wife's illness, and returned to Jerusalem after she passed away. At present he is a resident of Ma'ale Adumim.

References

External links

1960 births
Israeli Mizrahi Jews
Israeli people of Moroccan-Jewish descent
Living people
Politicians from Jerusalem
Bar-Ilan University alumni
Israeli settlers
Likud politicians
Jewish Israeli politicians
Members of the 20th Knesset (2015–2019)
Members of the 21st Knesset (2019)
Members of the 22nd Knesset (2019–2020)
Members of the 23rd Knesset (2020–2021)
Members of the 24th Knesset (2021–2022)
Members of the 25th Knesset (2022–)
Ministers of Communications of Israel